Patrick McGee   was a professional baseball player who played as a center fielder from 1874 to 1875 for the Brooklyn Atlantics and New York Mutuals.

References

External links
 

1889 deaths
Brooklyn Atlantics players
New York Mutuals players
Major League Baseball center fielders
19th-century baseball players
Burials at Calvary Cemetery (Queens)
Year of birth unknown